Otog Banner (Mongolian:   Otoɣ qosiɣu) is a banner of southwestern Inner Mongolia, People's Republic of China. It is under the administration of Ordos City, and borders Otog Front Banner to the southwest and Uxin Banner to the southeast.

History 
Evidence of human habitation in present-day Otog Banner dates back to the Neolithic era, when the area was inhabited by the Hetao people.

According to the banner's government, the area was ruled over by the Shang Dynasty during its existence.

During the Western Zhou period of the Zhou dynasty, the area around Otog Banner was home to ​​nomadic tribes such as Xianyun, who were part of the Beidi.

Following the Zhou dynasty, the area was inhabited by the Xiongnu.

In 215 BCE, the area was incorporated into the Qin dynasty as part of Beidi Commandery. In 50 CE, the southern Xiongnu and other tribes occupied the area, and present-day Otog Banner fell under the jurisdiction of Xiongnu .

During the Jin Dynasty and the Sixteen Kingdoms period, the area belonged to both the Former Zhao and Later Zhao.

In 407 CE, Helian Bobo established the Great Xia, which administered present-day Otog Banner.

In the 738 CE, the Tang dynasty took control, and organized the area under the You Prefecture, with present-day Otog Banner belonging to its subdivisions of Yan'en County, Guiren County, and Huaide County.

In 1038, the area of present-day Otog Banner became part of the Western Xia.

In 1226, Genghis Khan personally conquered the Western Xia, and rested his troops in the western portion of present-day Otog Banner. The following year, when the Western Xia was destroyed, the area became part of the Mongol Empire.

In 1462, Mongols resettled in Ordos, and in 1500, Dayan Khan restored the Wanhu organization, bringing the area under the control of Bars Bolud Jinong. The area would continue to be ruled by his descendants, including . The Ming dynasty retook control of the area in 1635, following Mongol surrender.

The Qing dynasty assumed control of the area in 1649, and re-organized the area of present-day Ordos under six different banners.

The Ordos Right Wing Middle Banner survived into the Republic of China, although it underwent various administrative changes: in 1930, Woye County was established within the banner, and the banner's yamen was abolished in 1936. The  took over the area in 1941, amid the Japanese invasion of China, but by 1942, the area was torn between three different governing systems.

On August 23, 1949, the People's Liberation Army took control of present-day Otog Banner, and by September 7, a provisional Communist Party government was established. Otog Banner was established in February 1950. In 1980, Otog Front Banner was split from Otog Banner, and in 1997, part of Otog Banner was transferred to Wuhai.

Geography and climate 

Otog Banner has a monsoon-influenced, continental cold desert climate (Köppen BWk), with long, cold and very dry winters, and hot, slightly wetter summers. There are 3,000 hours of sunshine and 122 frost-free days per year.

Administrative divisions 

Otog Banner administers four towns and two sum.

Economy 
As of 2019, Otog Banner had a gross domestic product (GDP) of 36.036 billion renminbi (RMB), a 8.4% increase from the previous year. Otog Banner's economy is largely industrial: the banner's primary sector accounts for 2.60% of its GDP, the secondary sector accounts for 73.10% of its GDP, and the tertiary sector accounts for 24.30%.

The per capita disposable income for residents of Otog Banner is 37,973 RMB as of 2019, a 7.4% increase from the previous year. Urban residents of Otog Banner average a disposable income of 48,994 RMB, which ranks 4th among the 101 county-level divisions of Inner Mongolia which reported this data in 2019. Rural residents average 20,244 RMB of disposable income, which ranks 24th among the 90 county-level divisions of Inner Mongolia which reported this data in 2019.

Education 
As of 2019, Otog Banner has eight primary schools and six regular secondary schools.

Culture 
As of 2019, Otog Banner has two theaters, and one stadium.

References

External links 
Official site 

Banners of Inner Mongolia
Ordos City